The 2016 Coral English Open was a professional ranking snooker tournament that took place between 10 and 16 October 2016 at the EventCity in Manchester, England. It was the seventh ranking event of the 2016/2017 season.

This was the inaugural English Open event, being held as part of a new Home Nations Series introduced in the 2016/2017 season with the existing Welsh Open and new Northern Ireland Open and Scottish Open tournaments. The winner of the English Open is awarded the Davis Trophy which is named in honour of six-time world champion Steve Davis.

Liang Wenbo captured his first ranking title by beating Judd Trump 9–6 in the final. As a result, he qualified for the Champion of Champions in November.

Alfie Burden made the 122nd official maximum break in the sixth frame of his first round match against Daniel Wells. It was Burden's first professional maximum break.

Prize fund
The breakdown of prize money for this year is shown below:

 Winner: £70,000
 Runner-up: £30,000
 Semi-final: £20,000
 Quarter-final: £10,000
 Last 16: £6,000
 Last 32: £3,500
 Last 64: £2,500 

 Highest break: £2,000
 Total: £366,000
 
The "rolling 147 prize" for a maximum break stood at £10,000.

Main draw

Top half

Section 1

Section 2

Section 3

Section 4

Bottom half

Section 5

Section 6

Section 7

Section 8

Finals

Final

Century breaks

 147  Alfie Burden
 140  Li Hang
 139, 125, 121, 102  Neil Robertson
 138, 136, 136, 134, 106  Liang Wenbo
 138  Ali Carter
 138  Mark Williams
 136  Tian Pengfei
 135, 106, 102  Xiao Guodong
 134, 132, 120  Judd Trump
 134  Joe Perry
 132  Mark Allen
 130, 107  Zhao Xintong
 130, 106  Chris Wakelin
 130  Zhang Anda
 126, 117, 110  Stephen Maguire
 126  Kritsanut Lertsattayathorn
 125  Mark Joyce
 122  Anthony McGill
 121  Ian Preece
 118, 103  Kyren Wilson
 116, 116  Stuart Bingham

 116, 115  Ricky Walden
 115  Martin Gould
 114, 103  John Higgins
 114  Barry Hawkins
 113  Zhou Yuelong
 112  Scott Donaldson
 111, 102  David Gilbert
 111  Duane Jones
 110  Ronnie O'Sullivan
 108, 106  Ding Junhui
 108  Shaun Murphy
 107  Ben Woollaston
 107  Tom Ford
 105  Michael Holt
 105  Ross Muir
 104  Allan Taylor
 103, 100  Marco Fu
 101  Rory McLeod
 100  Ryan Day
 100  Rod Lawler

References

Home Nations Series
2016
2016 in snooker
Open
English Open
Sports competitions in Manchester